Ruth Wallis (January 5, 1920 – December 22, 2007) was a novelty popular cabaret singer.

Career
Born Ruth Shirley Wohl in the Brooklyn borough of New York City, Wallis began her career singing jazz and cabaret standards – with such bands as Isham Jones and Benny Goodman on road tours for a couple of months; but gained fame in the 1940s and 1950s for her risqué, satirical songs, rife with double entendres that she wrote herself. She did have a mainstream hit with "Dear Mr. Godfrey," a song about Arthur Godfrey's public firing of Julius La Rosa, that reached #25 in late 1953.

She sang with a studio orchestra and often took on an accent for songs about characters from other countries. Her music was occasionally featured on the Doctor Demento show in the 1970s.

She started singing in lounges and cocktail bars, where she met her husband Hy Pastman.  Eventually it became clear that her novelty songs, which relied mostly upon double entendres, were the most popular.  These songs discussed a number of topics that were taboo in 1950s America, such as homosexuality and infidelity.  For this reason, her songs were banned from Boston radio stations.  She often had difficulty securing distribution for her works, so she started her own record label, Wallis Original Recordings.  When she arrived in Australia for a tour customs agents seized her records.  Rather than ruin her career, this only brought out crowds.

Wallis retired in the 1970s to spend more time with her husband and two children, but continued to work on material for Broadway shows.  Some of her most famous songs were collected and became the Off-Broadway hit, BOOBS! The Musical: The World According to Ruth Wallis. BOOBS! opened at the Triad Theater in New York City on May 19, 2003; by closing date it had played nearly 300 performances.  Produced and choreographed by Lawrence Leritz, it has had subsequent runs in New Orleans and Wichita.

In March 2007 Wallis was honored by the National Archives of Australia. Memorabilia of hers was included in 'Memory of a Nation', a permanent exhibition opening in Canberra.

Wallis died on December 22, 2007, in South Killingly, Connecticut, from complications of Alzheimer's disease.

Track listing for Ruth Wallis' Greatest Hits – Boobs
 "Queer Things"
 "Boobs"
 "Drill 'Em All"
 "Ubangi"
 "The Pistol Song"
 "He'd Rather Be a Girl"
 "Follies Bergere"
 "Admiral's Daughter"
 "Pizza"
 "De Gay Young Lad"
 "The Pop-Up Song"
 "Cape Canaveral Blues"
 "The Army Gave My Husband Back"
 "The Dinghy Song" (often confused with a similar song, "Davy's Dinghy")
 "Freddie the Fisherman's Song"
 "Hawaiian Lei Song"
 "The Same Little Yo-Yo"
 "Marriage Jewish Style"
 "The Bell Song"

Wallis Original Records
Wallis Original Records was a record label which was started in 1952 by Joel Leibowitz and Hy Pastman to release records by Ruth Wallis, the "queen of the double entendre". Their last release was Ruth Wallis' Greatest Hits – Boobs on December 1, 1998.

References
"Ruth Wallis, Singer-Writer of Risqué Songs, Dies at 87" (January 3, 2008) New York Times 
Boobs! The Musical.com
"Ruth Wallis: Return of the Saucy Chanteuse", an article originally published in Goldmine magazine, written by Chuck Miller

External links

 Ruth Wallis tracks available for streaming

King Records artists
American comedy musicians
Musicians from Brooklyn
American women comedians
Deaths from dementia in Connecticut
Deaths from Alzheimer's disease
1920 births
2007 deaths
Singers from New York City
20th-century American singers
Jewish American musicians
20th-century American women singers
20th-century American comedians
20th-century American Jews
21st-century American Jews
21st-century American women